The International School University of Lagos (ISL) was established in 1981. The school is a secondary school located in the University of Lagos (Unilag) in Nigeria. There was already a primary school in Unilag and there was a need for a secondary school for the children of lecturers and other staff.  The establishment of the International School in 1981 and its movement to a permanent site in October 1983 was part of the high points of the University of Lagos.

By virtue of being a secondary school located within a university, the students have access to quality teaching from well talented and professional teachers that are typically not available to other secondary schools. ISL maintains a healthy and competitive learning environment. If you can pass academically well in ISL, then you can pass any exam outside the school because of the high standard of teaching and examination performance grading system set in the school.   

It has a rivalry with King's College and Queen's College. ISL alumni have gone on to attend universities around the world, particularly in Nigeria, Britain and the United States. The Past Principals of the school include Mr. Nuhu Hassan (1997-2009), Dr. S.A. Oladipo (2009-2011), Mrs. Adora E. Ojo (2011-2017), Dr. M.B. Malik (2017 - 2021) and Mr. K.O Amusan (2021 till date).

The school is highly developed in sports and has unlimited access to the University of Lagos Sports Centre. Students are able to engage in any sporting activity of their choice. The school has also won numerous national and state laurels -- especially in basketball -- since its establishment.

Admissions 
Entrance into International School Lagos is fiercely competitive and applicants have to attend a first round of tests, following which only successful applicants are invited to a second and final stage assessment which includes a tour of the school.

References

External links 
 University of Lagos
 ISL Class of 88 alumni

Secondary schools in Lagos State
Educational institutions established in 1981
University of Lagos
International schools in Lagos
1981 establishments in Nigeria